Timofey Sergeyevich Kalachyov (born 1 May 1981) is a Belarusian professional football coach and a former player. He is an assistant coach with Russian club Chayka Peschanokopskoye. He played right winger or right midfielder.

Club career
Kalachyov signed a five-year contract with Ukrainian side Shakhtar Donetsk from Belarusian Shakhtyor Soligorsk in January 2004.

He signed a three-year contract with Krylia Sovetov Samara in January 2008. In 2010, Kalachyov signed with another Russian Premier League club, Rostov.

On 16 May 2019, Rostov announced that the game against Zenit Saint Petersburg on 19 May would be his farewell game as a Rostov player after 11 seasons spent at the club. He confirmed his retirement after that game.

International career
Kalachyov captained the Belarus national team between March 2014 and March 2015.

Personal life
Kalachyov's older brother Dzmitry Kalachow is also a professional footballer. His father was Belarusian, while his mother is of Russian descent.

Career statistics

Club

International

Scores and results list Belarus' goal tally first, score column indicates score after each Kalachyov goal.

Honours
Rostov
 Russian Cup: 2013–14

Khimki
 Russian Cup runner-up: 2004–05

Individual
 Belarusian Footballer of the Year: 2013, 2016

References

External links
 
 

1981 births
Living people
People from Mogilev
Association football midfielders
Belarusian footballers
Belarusian expatriate footballers
Belarus under-21 international footballers
Belarus international footballers
FC Dnepr Mogilev players
FC Veino players
Belarusian Premier League players
FC Shakhtar Donetsk players
FC Rostov players
PFC Krylia Sovetov Samara players
Expatriate footballers in Russia
Expatriate footballers in Ukraine
Belarusian expatriate sportspeople in Ukraine
FC Khimki players
FC Mariupol players
Ukrainian Premier League players
Russian Premier League players
Belarusian expatriate sportspeople in Russia
FC Shakhtyor Soligorsk players
Belarusian people of Russian descent
Sportspeople from Mogilev Region